Bourton-on-the-Water railway station was a Gloucestershire railway station on the Great Western Railway's Banbury and Cheltenham Direct Railway which opened in 1881 and closed in 1964.

History 
The Bourton-on-the-Water railway station was situated just to the north of the village and served surrounding villages like Lower Slaughter. It was rebuilt in 1936 by the Chief Architect to the Great Western Railway, Percy Emerson Culverhouse. The station was host to a GWR camp coach in 1935, 1938 and 1939.

The station passed on to the Western Region of British Railways on nationalisation in 1948. The last passenger service to the station was on 13 October 1962. Goods services between the station and Cheltenham ceased in 1962 with the service between Bourton and Kingham closing a year later.

Stationmasters

George Spreckley ca. 1863
Edward Jackson Cuff 1864 - 1866 (afterwards station master at Moreton-in-Marsh)
Charles William Caldicot 1868 - 1871
George Pope ca. 1879 ca. 1891
Robert Eaton from 1893 
William L. Mills until 1897
George Christopher Anney 1897 - 1904 (formerly station master at Leckhampton, afterwards station master at Moreton-in-Marsh)
William Henry Penson 1905 - 1917 (afterwards station master at Brinscombe)
F.C. Price
William Albert Mace 1922 - 1929
N.J. Fletcher from 1929 
W. May until 1934
H.E. Spencer from 1934

Present day 
Following closure, the station was used as a highways depot by Gloucestershire County Council. The (last) station building, built in the 1930s, was demolished in 2011.

The Gloucestershire Warwickshire Railway had considered reusing the building at its Broadway railway station, but later changed its mind.

References

External links
The station on a 1947 OS Map

Disused railway stations in Gloucestershire
Former Great Western Railway stations
Railway stations in Great Britain opened in 1862
Railway stations in Great Britain closed in 1964
1862 establishments in England